Długie  is a village in the administrative district of Gmina Lgota Wielka, within Radomsko County, Łódź Voivodeship, in central Poland.

Location

Manufacturing
The village is known for its machine parts factory, which was opened in 1993, and manufactures trencher components that are used by the Polish construction firm Tauron Cieplo.

References

Villages in Radomsko County